John Law, D.D. (b Bombay 31 January 1739 - d Rochester 5 February 1827) was an Anglican priest, most notably Archdeacon of Rochester  from 3 September 1767 until his death.

Law was educated at Harrow; and Emmanuel College, Cambridge. He held livings at Wateringbury, Shorne, Chatham, Westmill and Great Easton.

Notes

People from Mumbai
1739 births
1827 deaths
Alumni of Emmanuel College, Cambridge
People educated at Harrow School
19th-century English Anglican priests
18th-century English Anglican priests
Archdeacons of Rochester